Ruggles of Red Gap is a 1923 American silent Western film directed by James Cruze and written by Anthony Coldeway and Walter Woods that was adapted from the novel by Harry Leon Wilson. The film stars Edward Everett Horton, Ernest Torrence, Lois Wilson, Fritzi Ridgeway, Charles Stanton Ogle, Louise Dresser, Anna Lehr, and William Austin. The film was released on October 7, 1923, by Paramount Pictures.

Plot
An English valet brought to the American west assimilates into the American way of life.

Cast

Preservation
With no prints of Ruggles of Red Gap located in any film archives, it is a lost film.

References

External links
 
 

1923 films
1920s English-language films
1923 Western (genre) films
Paramount Pictures films
Films directed by James Cruze
American black-and-white films
Films based on American novels
Lost Western (genre) films
Lost American films
1923 lost films
Silent American Western (genre) films
1920s American films